The Texas A&M–Corpus Christi Islanders is the basketball team that represent Texas A&M University–Corpus Christi in Corpus Christi, Texas, United States. The school's team currently competes in the Southland Conference. The team last played in the NCAA Division I men's basketball tournament in 2023. The Islanders were most recently coached by Steve Lutz. The school's first season of basketball was 1999–2000.

Coaching
 Head coach - Steve Lutz
 Assistant coach - Ralph Davis II

Former coaches
 Ronnie Arrow
 Perry Clark
 Willis Wilson

Postseason results

NCAA tournament results
The Islanders have appeared in the NCAA tournament three times. Their combined record is 1–3.

CIT results
The Islanders have appeared in the CollegeInsider.com Postseason Tournament (CIT) four times. Their combined record is 6–4.

References

External links
 Texas A&M–Corpus Christi Athletics